Upon the dissolution of the 39th Canadian Parliament, 65 of the 308 seats (21.1 per cent) were held by women. Canada ranks 45th in the world in representation of women in the national lower house.

There were 64 women elected to Parliament in the 2006 election, and the victory of Bloc Québécois MP Ève-Mary Thaï Thi Lac in a byelection on September 17, 2007 brought the number to 65. This matched but did not exceed the all-time record of 65 female MPs elected in the 2004 election, and the number of women in the House returned to 64 with the resignation of Lucienne Robillard on January 25, 2008.

It nominally increased to a record 66 with the by-election wins of Martha Hall Findlay and Joyce Murray on March 17, 2008, although the resignation of Brenda Chamberlain from the House effective April 7, 2008 reduced the number of women back to 65 just one week after Findlay and Murray were sworn in as MPs.

General notes

Fifteen of the 65 female MPs in the 39th Parliament, or 23.4 per cent, were elected for the first time in the 2006 election. The longest-serving female MPs were the Liberals Albina Guarnieri and Diane Marleau, both elected for the first time in the 1988 election. (New Democrat Dawn Black was also elected for the first time in that election; defeated in the 1993 election, she won her seat back in the 2006 election.)

From Confederation to the end of the 39th Parliament, a total of 193 female MPs sat in the House of Commons of Canada, 4.79 per cent of the 4,023 total MPs ever to serve. The 65 female MPs upon dissolution of the 39th Parliament constitute 33.6 per cent of this total.

The percentage of women in the House has remained more or less stable since 1993.

By province

By party

Women were 23.3 per cent of all candidates in the 2006 election, and 24.8 per cent of candidates from the parties that won representation in Parliament.

The NDP nominated the largest proportion of women: more than a third of all New Democratic candidates were women, and nearly a third of all female candidates in the election were New Democrats. Furthermore, the NDP ended up with a higher proportion of women in its caucus than women candidates, meaning it ran women in ridings they could win – 18.8% of female MPs are New Democrats while the NDP holds only 9.4% of the seats in the House. As of 2007, the 12 women and 18 men currently sitting as New Democrats constitute the most gender-balanced party caucus ever elected to the Canadian House of Commons by a party with official party status.

However, it was with the Bloc Québécois that women candidates had the highest chance of winning: nearly three quarters of female Bloc candidates were elected. (As the Bloc runs candidates only in Quebec, the election of 50 Bloc MPs meant that any Bloc candidate had a 66.6% chance of winning.) 26.6% of female MPs are Bloquistes, while the Bloc holds only 16.2% of the seats.

As for the winning party, only 12% of Conservative candidates were women, and 11% of Conservative MPs are women, a total of fourteen; 21.5% of female MPs are Tories in a House that is 40.6% Conservative.

Cabinet

The 27-member Cabinet contains six women ministers (22%), including one senator.

Of the 25 parliamentary secretaries, five (20%) are women.

Ten of the fourteen female government MPs (71%) are ministers or parliamentary secretaries.

Senate

The 105-seat Senate currently has 90 sitting senators, of whom 32 (35.5%) are women. Stephen Harper has only made two Senate appointments to date, both men (Michael Fortier and Bert Brown). The previous prime minister, Paul Martin, made 17 Senate appointments, of whom six (35.3%) were women.

Two current Senators are members of the Cabinet; as noted above, one of them is a woman, Marjory LeBreton.

List of women MPs by province

Note: † indicates a cabinet minister, and * indicates a parliamentary secretary.

Newfoundland and Labrador 

None

Nova Scotia

Prince Edward Island 

None

New Brunswick 

None

Quebec 

‡ Ève-Mary Thaï Thi Lac was elected to the House in a by-election on September 17, 2007. Lucienne Robillard resigned from the House on January 25, 2008.

Ontario 

‡ Martha Hall Findlay was elected to the House in a by-election on March 17, 2008. Brenda Chamberlain has announced her resignation from the House effective April 7, 2008.

Manitoba

Saskatchewan

Alberta

British Columbia 

‡ Joyce Murray was elected to the House in a by-election on March 17, 2008.

Territories

See also
Women in the 40th Canadian Parliament
Women in Canadian politics
Women in Canadian provincial and territorial legislatures

External links
Women in Parliament - Parliament of Canada
Current lists of women in the House of Commons - Parliament of Canada
Historical lists of women in the House of Commons - Parliament of Canada

39th Canadian Parliament
Parliament, 39